The 2018 CAF Champions League knockout stage was played from 14 September to 9 November 2018. A total of eight teams competed in the knockout stage to decide the champions of the 2018 CAF Champions League.

Qualified teams
The winners and runners-up of each of the four groups in the group stage advanced to the quarter-finals.

Format

In the knockout stage, the eight teams played a single-elimination tournament. Each tie was played on a home-and-away two-legged basis. If the aggregate score was tied after the second leg, the away goals rule would be applied, and if still tied, extra time would not be played, and the penalty shoot-out would be used to determine the winner (Regulations III. 26 & 27).

Schedule
The schedule of each round was as follows (matches scheduled in midweek in italics). Effective from the Champions League group stage, weekend matches were played on Fridays and Saturdays while midweek matches were played on Tuesdays, with some exceptions. Kick-off times were also fixed at 13:00 (Saturdays and Tuesdays only), 16:00 and 19:00 GMT.

Bracket
The bracket of the knockout stage was determined as follows:

The bracket was decided after the draw for the knockout stage (quarter-finals and semi-finals), which was held on 3 September 2018, 20:00 EET (UTC+2), at the CAF headquarters in Cairo, Egypt.

Quarter-finals

In the quarter-finals, the winners of one group played the runners-up of another group (teams from same group could not play each other), with the group winners hosting the second leg, and the matchups decided by draw.

|}

1–1 on aggregate. 1º de Agosto won on away goals.

Espérance de Tunis won 3–1 on aggregate.

ES Sétif won 1–0 on aggregate.

Al-Ahly won 4–0 on aggregate.

Semi-finals

In the semi-finals, the four quarter-final winners played in two ties, with the matchups and order of legs decided by draw.

|}

Al-Ahly won 3–2 on aggregate.

Espérance de Tunis won 4–3 on aggregate.

Final

In the final, the two semi-final winners played each other, with the order of legs determined by the semi-final draw.

Espérance de Tunis won 4–3 on aggregate.

References

External links
22nd Edition Of Total CAF Champions League, CAFonline.com

3
September 2018 sports events in Africa
October 2018 sports events in Africa
November 2018 sports events in Africa